Rudý večerník ('Red Evening Newspaper') was a communist evening newspaper published from Prague, interbellum Czechoslovakia. As of 1938 the paper was estimated to have a circulation of 100,000. It was the evening edition of the central party organ Rudé právo. The newspaper was initially known as Rudé právo Večerník ('Red Justice - Evening'), the name Rudý večerník was adopted on 1 April 1928. Ivan Olbracht served as editor-in-chief of Rudý večerník.

References

Communist newspapers
Communist Party of Czechoslovakia
Czech-language newspapers
Newspapers published in Prague
Publications with year of establishment missing
Publications with year of disestablishment missing
Defunct newspapers published in Czechoslovakia